The heats for the women's 50 m breaststroke race at the 2009 World Championships took place in the morning of 1 August, with the final in the evening session of 2 August at the Foro Italico in Rome, Italy.

Records
Prior to this competition, the existing world and competition records were as follows:

The following records were established during the competition:

Results

Heats

Semifinals

Swim-off

Final

External links
Heats Results
Semifinals Results
Swim-off Results
Final Results

Breaststroke Women's 50 m
2009 in women's swimming